Guje Agneta Sevón (born 20 September 1943) is a Swedish and Finnish academic in psychology, and management and organization. She is currently focusing her research on individuals and organizations in a world of travelling management ideas and mutable resources.

Education 
Sevón holds an MA in psychology from University of Uppsala, Sweden 1965 and a doctorate degree in psychology from Åbo Akademi University, Finland 1978.

Affiliations 
Guje Sevón is Professor emerita, retired from a chair in Economic Psychology at Stockholm School of Economics, Sweden. Between 1983 and 2001 she was professor of Management and organization and Head of Department of Management and Organization at Hanken School of Economics, in Helsinki, Finland. Before that, between 1973 and 1983, she was Head of the Research Institute of Hanken. She is appointed Adjunct Professor in Psychology at Åbo Akademi University, and Adjunct Professor in Adult Education at University of Helsinki.
Meanwhile, she has also been Guest Professor at Copenhagen Business School , Denmark, Fulbright Research Scholar at Stanford University, USA, and visiting Research Fellow at University of Auckland Business School , New Zealand, University of Technology, Sydney, Australia and University of Siena , Italy. She is one of the five founders of the research institute Scancor at Stanford University  and she was a board member of International Association of Applied Psychology .

Sevón is a member of the Finnish Society of Sciences and Letters  since 1986. Besides her academic occupation she has been engaged as member of boards, e.g. in Aktia Bank (Helsinki, Finland), The Folkhälsan Foundation (Helsinki, Finland), and Moderna Dansteatern - MDT (Stockholm, Sweden). She is currently chair of the board of Grafikens Hus (Sweden), and member of the board of the Swedish-Danish Culture Fund.

Guje Sevón is since 1999 married to professor Per Olof Berg  and resident of Strängnäs, Sweden. She holds a Swedish and a Finnish citizenship.

Bibliography (a selection) 
Sevón, G. (1978) Prediction of social events. Dissertation, Summary. Åbo Akademi University.   
March, J. G., & Sevon, G. (1984) Gossip, information, and decision-making. Advances in information processing in organizations, 1, 95-107. 
Czarniawska-Joerges, B. & Sevón, G. (1996) Translating organizational change, Berlin ; New York: Walter de Gruyter.
Czarniawska, B., & Sevón, G. (2003) The Northern Lights - Organization Theory in Scandinavia. Malmö: Liber. 
Czarniawska-Joerges, B. & Sevón, G. (2005) Global ideas: how ideas, objects and practices travel in a global economy, Malmö: Liber & Copenhagen Business School Press.

References 

1943 births
Living people
Swedish business theorists
Swedish psychologists
Swedish women psychologists
Uppsala University alumni
Åbo Akademi University alumni
Academic staff of the Stockholm School of Economics
Academic staff of Åbo Akademi University
Academic staff of the University of Helsinki
People from Gotland
Swedish women academics
Finnish people of Swedish descent
Swedish expatriates in Finland
Naturalized citizens of Finland